The Knowsley Heights fire occurred in 1991 at the 11-story Knowsley Heights tower block in Huyton, Merseyside. No-one was injured in the fire.

Fire
The fire was deliberately started when rubbish was set alight outside the 11-story Knowsley Heights tower block in Huyton, Merseyside. The flames began at the bottom of the building, and spread through a  gap between the wall and the newly installed rainscreen cladding. The fire spread to all floors of the 11-storey building, causing extensive damage to the walls and windows of the building. The interior of the building did not suffer damage, as the fire did not enter the inside of the building. No-one was injured in the fire.

Aftermath
The Building Research Establishment (BRE) determined that the cladding around Knowsley Heights was a low risk of combustibility. They also highlighted that the building lacked firebreaks. The cladding used in Knowsley Heights was declared legal. The incident was mentioned by BRE for subsequent changes in building regulations. 

The Knowsley Heights fire featured in the BBC Two documentary The Fires that Foretold Grenfell, which was first broadcast in October 2018.

See also
 1999 Garnock Court fire
 2005 Harrow Court fire
 2009 Lakanal House fire
 2017 Grenfell Tower fire

References

1991 in England
1991 fires in the United Kingdom
Building and structure fires in England
Residential building fires